Patrik Tischler (born 30 July 1991) is a Hungarian football player who plays for Budafok.

Club career
He made his debut for MTK during the 2008–09 season and joined Oldham on loan in 2009 as part of an agreement between Oldham, MTK and Liverpool. He joined the club's new Development squad. He was given the no. 34 squad number and was named as substitute for the first-team on a number of occasions.  In February 2010 he returned to MTK after his loan period was cut short.

On 21 June 2022, Tischler signed with Budafok.

International career
Tischler has represented Hungary at international level as an under-19 and under-21 player.

Club statistics

Updated to games played as of 15 May 2022.

References

External links
 
 

1991 births
Footballers from Budapest
Living people
Hungarian footballers
Hungary youth international footballers
Hungary under-21 international footballers
Association football forwards
MTK Budapest FC players
Oldham Athletic A.F.C. players
Puskás Akadémia FC players
Újpest FC players
Fehérvár FC players
Budapest Honvéd FC players
Kisvárda FC players
Debreceni VSC players
Budafoki LC footballers
Nemzeti Bajnokság I players
Nemzeti Bajnokság II players
Hungarian expatriate footballers
Expatriate footballers in England
Hungarian expatriate sportspeople in England